Hyperalonia is a genus of bee flies in the family Bombyliidae.

Hyperalonia is one of the most striking genera of bee flies that can be found in the Neotropical region. The species included in this genus have a large bluish black body with several tufts of red and white hairs, bluish black wings and a yellow head with dark blue eyes.

Species
These seven species belong to the genus Hyperalonia:
 Hyperalonia atra Painter & Painter, 1968
 Hyperalonia chilensis Rondani, 1863
 Hyperalonia coeruleiventris (Macquart, 1846)
 Hyperalonia diminuta Couri & Lamas, 1994
 Hyperalonia erythrocephala (Fabricius, 1805)
 Hyperalonia morio (Fabricius, 1775)
 Hyperalonia surinamensis Rondani, 1863

References 

Bombyliidae
Asiloidea genera